Niš operation was an offensive operation of the Bulgarian army, supported by Yugoslav Partisans against German Army Group E to secure the left flank of the Third Ukrainian Front of the Red Army.

It was held from October 8–14, 1944. Second Bulgarian Army, in cooperation with Yugoslav People's Liberation Army and IX Air Corps of the Red Army was ordered to destroy the German troops and to seize Niš. Its enemy was 
7th SS Volunteer Mountain Division Prinz Eugen, or about 21 500 people from 13 infantry battalions, featuring 154 guns, 164 mortars, 38 tanks and 18 aircraft. Their task was to cover the retreat of 300,000 German soldiers from the composition of the Army Group "E". Bulgarian troops entered the brunt along the River Southern Morava. On October 10, the Sofia armored brigade, consisting of about 150 tanks, most of which Panzer IV, and the rest Panzer 38(t) and Panzer 35(t), aided by ca. 40 Leichter Panzerspähwagen, and 50 Sturmgeschütz III, penetrated in the defense of the Germans and forced them to retreat west of the Southern Morava. On October 12 and 13 Bulgarian troops continue pursuit. On October 14 parts of the VI Infantry Division, using the jab from the south of the armored brigade seized Niš and completely pushed the Nazis. Losses of the Wehrmacht amounted up to 5200 killed and 3850 prisoners of war, but they managed to hold its position in the Vardar corridor to the withdrawal of the remaining German troops.

See also
Stratsin–Kumanovo operation
Kosovo operation 
Bregalnitsa–Strumica operation

Citations

Battles and operations of World War II
Military operations of World War II involving Germany
Yugoslavia in World War II
Battles involving the Yugoslav Partisans
Military operations of World War II involving Bulgaria
1944 in Yugoslavia
Conflicts in 1944
October 1944 events